This is a list of notable events in music that took place in the year 1959.

Specific locations
1959 in British music
1959 in Norwegian music

Specific genres
1959 in country music
1959 in jazz

Events
January 5 – The first sessions for Ella Fitzgerald's George and Ira Gershwin Songbook are held.
January 12 – Tamla Records is founded by Berry Gordy Jr. in Detroit, Michigan.
January 22 – Buddy Holly records some acoustic demos in his New York City apartment, the last songs he will record. Songs included "Peggy Sue Got Married", "Crying, Waiting, Hoping", "Learning the Game", "What to Do", "That's What They Say", and "That Makes It Tough."
January 29 – The first Melodifestivalen, an annual Swedish music competition that determines the country's representative for the Eurovision Song Contest, is held in Stockholm.
February 3 – "The Day the Music Died": Buddy Holly, Ritchie Valens and The Big Bopper are killed in a plane crash in Iowa. Future country star Waylon Jennings was scheduled to be on the plane, but instead gave his seat up to The Big Bopper.
March 2–April 22 – The recording sessions for the extremely influential Miles Davis jazz album Kind of Blue take place at the CBS 30th Street Studio in New York City. The album is released on August 17 in the United States, opening with Davis' "So What" and including the Davis-Bill Evans composition "Blue in Green".
March 11 – The 4th Eurovision Song Contest is held in Cannes, France, and won by the Netherlands with the song "Een beetje" performed by Teddy Scholten.
April 3 – The BBC in the United Kingdom bans The Coasters song "Charlie Brown" because of the word "spitball", a decision it reverses later in the month.
April 24 – The Your Hit Parade television series airs its last episode in the United States.
May 4 – The 1st Annual Grammy Awards are held in Los Angeles. Henry Mancini's The Music from Peter Gunn wins Album of the Year, while Domenico Modugno's song "Nel blu, dipinto di blu (Volare)" wins both Record of the Year and Song of the Year.
May 12 – Plácido Domingo makes his stage debut at the Teatro Degollado in Guadalajara as Pascual in Marina.
May 30 – Helge Rosvaenge gives his farewell concert at Vienna's Great Musikvereinsaal.
June 11 – Violence erupts at the Seventh Festival of Neapolitan Song in a scandal that sparks a parliamentary inquiry amidst accusations of corruption and involvement of organized crime in a song competition that is seen to have become increasingly commercialised.
July–November – Alan Lomax and English singer Shirley Collins make a folksong collecting trip in the Southern United States during which they 'discover' Mississippi Fred McDowell.
August 25–September 5 – Darmstädter Ferienkurse held in Darmstadt, with lectures by Włodzimierz Kotoński, György Ligeti, Andrzej Markowski, Yoritsune Matsudaira, Werner Meyer-Eppler, Luigi Nono, Henri Pousseur, Karlheinz Stockhausen and Bo Wallner, and world premieres of Claude Baillif's Mouvements pour deux, Sylvano Bussotti's Piano Pieces for David Tudor, Cornelius Cardew's Two Books of Study for Pianists and Piano Piece 1959, Niccolo Castiglioni's Cangiati per pianoforte, Roman Haubenstock-Ramati's Interpolation: Mobile pour flûte, Mauricio Kagel's Transición II, Angelo Paccagnini's Canti brevi: secondo libro, and Stockhausen's Zyklus.
September 13 – Bo Diddley's single "Say Man" enters the US R&B charts.
November 29 – Though they are held in the same year as the inaugural ceremony, the 2nd Annual Grammy Awards are held in Los Angeles and New York and are notable for being the first televised Grammy Award ceremony. Frank Sinatra's Come Dance with Me! wins Album of the Year, Bobby Darin's version of "Mack the Knife" wins Record of the Year and Jimmy Driftwood's song "The Battle of New Orleans" wins Song of the Year. Darin is also awarded Best New Artist.
 Fall – Bill Haley & His Comets end their groundbreaking association with Decca Records, for whom they have recorded since 1954. Their first recording for the label, "Rock Around the Clock", helped usher in the rock and roll era. Haley signs with Warner Bros. Records.
 Joan Baez performs at the first Newport Folk Festival as a surprise guest and becomes an underground favorite
 Otto Luening and Vladimir Ussachevsky co-found the Columbia-Princeton Electronic Music Center in New York City.
 The National Academy of Recording Arts and Sciences in the United States sponsors the first Grammy Award ceremony for music recorded in 1958.
 Dalida receives a Music Oscar for Best Song and a first foreign award (a "Golden Lion" in Berlin).
 Jacques Loussier releases Play Bach No.1 with bassist Pierre Michelot and percussionist Christian Garros.
 Ornette Coleman plays a legendary and controversial concert at New York's Five Spot.
 Roy Orbison signs with Monument Records.
 The Supremes are founded as a quartet ("The Primettes").
 Jimi Hendrix buys his first electric guitar: a White Single pickup Supro Ozark 1560 S.
 Veteran sarodiya and multi-instrumentalist Allauddin Khan records for All India Radio.
Jilin opera is developed in China.
Approximate date – Ballads and Blues folk club founded by Ewan MacColl and others in a London pub in Soho as part of the second British folk revival.

Albums released (in alphabetical order)
 An Evening Wasted with Tom Lehrer – Tom Lehrer
 At Large – The Kingston Trio
 Ballad of the Blues – Jo Stafford
 Bill Haley's Chicks – Bill Haley & His Comets
 Blind Joe Death – John Fahey
 The Cats – John Coltrane
 Cattin' with Coltrane and Quinichette – John Coltrane & Paul Quinichette
 Chega De Saudade – João Gilberto
 Chuck Berry Is on Top – Chuck Berry
 Cliff – Cliff Richard (debut) ('Live' and with 'The Drifters')
 Cliff Sings – Cliff Richard
 Come Dance with Me! – Frank Sinatra
 Como Swings – Perry Como
 Cuttin' Capers – Doris Day
 A Date with Elvis – Elvis Presley
 Dinah, Yes Indeed! – Dinah Shore
 Dreams of Italy – Johnny Cole
 Ella Fitzgerald Sings Sweet Songs for Swingers – Ella Fitzgerald
 Ella Fitzgerald Sings the George and Ira Gershwin Songbook – Ella Fitzgerald
 Everybody Digs Bill Evans – Bill Evans
 50,000,000 Elvis Fans Can't Be Wrong – Elvis Presley
 For LP Fans Only – Elvis Presley
 ...from the "Hungry i" – The Kingston Trio (live)
 The Genius of Ray Charles – Ray Charles
 Get Happy! – Ella Fitzgerald
 Go Bo Diddley – Bo Diddley
 Greatest! – Johnny Cash
 Gunfighter Ballads and Trail Songs – Marty Robbins
 Here We Go Again! – The Kingston Trio
 How to Speak Hip – Del Close and John Brent
 Hymns by Johnny Cash – Johnny Cash
 I'll Be Seeing You – Jo Stafford
 I'm Nobody's Baby – Jo Ann Campbell
 A Jazz Portrait of Frank Sinatra – Oscar Peterson
 Kind of Blue – Miles Davis
 Liturgical Jazz – Ed Summerlin
 Lonely Street – Andy Williams
 Look to Your Heart – Frank Sinatra
 Love in Portofino (A San Cristina) – Dalida
 Mingus Ah Um – Charles Mingus
 Moanin' in the Moonlight – Howlin' Wolf (debut)
 Newk's Time – Sonny Rollins
 No One Cares – Frank Sinatra
 ¡Olé Tormé!: Mel Tormé Goes South of the Border with Billy May – Mel Tormé
 Once Upon a Summertime – Blossom Dearie
 Persuasive Percussion – Terry Snyder and the All Stars
 Porgy and Bess – Miles Davis
 Ricky Sings Again – Ricky Nelson
 Ritchie Valens – Ritchie Valens
 Season's Greetings from Perry Como – Perry Como
 The Shape of Jazz to Come – Ornette Coleman
 The Song You Heard When You Fell in Love – Betty Johnson
 Songs of our Soil – Johnny Cash
 Stereo Concert – The Kingston Trio (live)
 Strictly Instrumental – Bill Haley & His Comets
 Swing Along – The Four Lads
 Swing Me an Old Song – Julie London
 That's All - Bobby Darin
 Time Out – Dave Brubeck Quartet
 Vaughan and Violins – Sarah Vaughan
 What a Diff'rence a Day Makes! – Dinah Washington
 Your Number Please – Julie London

Biggest hit singles
The following songs achieved the highest chart positions
in the charts of 1959.

Top hits on record (in alphabetical order)

Published popular music 
 "77 Sunset Strip"  Mack David & Jerry Livingston
 "Along Came Jones" w.m. Jerry Leiber & Mike Stoller
 "All My Tomorrows" w. Sammy Cahn m. Jimmy Van Heusen, from the film A Hole in the Head
 "Alvin's Harmonica" w.m. Ross Bagdasarian
 "Angela Jones" w.m. John D. Loudermilk
 "Anyone Would Love You" w.m. Harold Rome. Introduced by Andy Griffith and Dolores Gray in the musical Destry Rides Again
 "The Battle of New Orleans" trad arr. Jimmy Driftwood
 "The Best Is Yet to Come" w. Carolyn Leigh m. Cy Coleman
 "Best Of Everything" w. Sammy Cahn m. Lionel Newman, from the film The Best of Everything
 "A Big Hunk o' Love" w. m. Aaron Schroeder & Sid Wyche
 "Big Iron" w.m. Marty Robbins
 "Breaking Up Is Hard To Do" w.m. Neil Sedaka & Howard Greenfield
 "The Children's Marching Song" trad arr. Malcolm Arnold. Performed by Ingrid Bergman and The Orphans' Chorus in the film Inn of the Sixth Happiness
 "China Doll" w.m. Cindy Walker
 "Ciao, Ciao, Bambina" w.(Eng) Mitchell Parish (Ital) Eduardo Verde & Domenico Modugno m. Domenico Modugno
 "Climb Ev'ry Mountain" w. Oscar Hammerstein II m. Richard Rodgers. Introduced by Patricia Neway in the musical Sound of Music
 "Come Softly To Me" w.m. Gary Troxel, Barbara Ellis & Gretchen Christopher
 "Delaware" w.m. Irving Gordon
 "Don't You Know?" w.m. adapt. Bobby Worth
 "Do-Re-Mi" w. Oscar Hammerstein II m. Richard Rodgers. Introduced by Mary Martin in the musical Sound of Music. Sung by Julie Andrews in the film version.
 "Dream Lover" w.m. Bobby Darin
 "Early In The Morning" adapt Bruce Belland & Glen Larson
 "Edelweiss" w. Oscar Hammerstein II m. Richard Rodgers. Introduced by Mary Martin in the musical Sound of Music. Sung by Julie Andrews and Christopher Plummer in the film version.
 "El Paso" w.m. Marty Robbins
 "Endlessly" w.m. Clyde Otis & Brook Benton
 "Everything's Coming Up Roses" w. Stephen Sondheim m. Jule Styne. Introduced by Ethel Merman in the musical Gypsy. Sung in the film version by Lisa Kirk dubbing for Rosalind Russell.
 "Frankie" w. Howard Greenfield m. Neil Sedaka
 "Game Of Poker" w. Johnny Mercer m. Harold Arlen, from the musical Saratoga
 "Goodbye Jimmy, Goodbye" w.m. Jack Vaughn
 "Greenfields" w.m. Terry Gilkyson, Rich Dehr & Frank Miller
 "Handy Man" w.m. Otis Blackwell & Jimmy Jones
 "The Hanging Tree" w. Mack David m. Jerry Livingston. Introduced by Marty Robbins in the film The Hanging Tree
 "Happy Anniversary" w. Al Stillman m. Robert Allen
 "The Happy Organ" w.m. Kurt Wood, David Clowney & James Kreigsmann
 "Heartaches By The Number" w.m. Harlan Howard
 "He'll Have To Go" w.m. Joe Allison & Audrey Allison
 "High Hopes" w. Sammy Cahn m. Jimmy Van Heusen. Introduced by Frank Sinatra and Eddie Hodges in the film A Hole in the Head.
 "I Ain't Never" w.m. Mel Tillis
 "I Feel Sorry For The Girl" w.m. Glenn Paxton, Robert Goldman & George Weiss
 "I Know" w.m. Carl Stutz & Edith Lindeman
 "I Need Your Love Tonight" w.m. Sid Wayne & Bix Reichner
 "I Wanna Be Around" w.m. Johnny Mercer & Sadie Vimmerstedt
 "If I Ever Fall In Love Again" w. Peter Wildeblood m. Peter Greenwell
 "I'll Never Fall In Love Again" Johnnie Ray
 "I'm Gonna Get Married" w.m. Lloyd Price & Harold Logan
 "I'm Looking Out the Window" John Jacob Niles, Don Raye
 "I'm Never Gonna Tell" Hoffman, Manning, Markwell
 "In A Little While" w. Marshall Barer m. Mary Rodgers
 "It Doesn't Matter Anymore" w.m. Paul Anka
 "Kansas City" w.m. Jerry Leiber & Mike Stoller
 "Kookie, Kookie (Lend Me Your Comb)" w.m. Irving Taylor
 "Let Me Entertain You" w. Stephen Sondheim m. Jule Styne. Introduced by Sandra Church and chorus in the musical Gypsy.
 "Like Young" m. André Previn
 "Lipstick On Your Collar" w. Eddie Lewis m. George Goehring
 "Little Donkey" w.m. Eric Boswell
 "The Little Drummer Boy" w.m. adapt. Henry Onorati, Katherine Davis & Harry Simeone
 "Little Tin Box" w. Sheldon Harnick m. Jerry Bock
 "The Little White Bull" Lionel Bart, Michael Pratt, Jimmy Bennett
 "Living Doll" w.m. Lionel Bart
 "Lock Up Your Daughters" w. Lionel Bart m. Laurie Johnson
 "Lonely Blue Boy" Ben Weisman, Fred Wise
 "Lonely Boy" w.m. Paul Anka
 "The Lonely Goatherd" w. Oscar Hammerstein II m. Richard Rodgers. Introduced by Mary Martin and the children in the musical Sound of Music. Performed by Julie Andrews in the film version.
 "Lonely Street" w.m. Carl Belew, Kenny Sowder & W. S. Stevenson
 "Love Potion No. 9" w.m. Jerry Leiber & Mike Stoller
 "Love Will Find Out The Way" w.m. Glenn Paxton, Robert Goldman & George Weiss
 "Lullaby In Ragtime" w.m. Sylvia Fine. Introduced by Danny Kaye in the film The Five Pennies.
 "The M.T.A." w.m. adapt. Jacqueline Steiner & Bess Hawes
 "Maria" w. Oscar Hammerstein II m. Richard Rodgers. Introduced by Patricia Neway, Muriel O'Malley, Elizabeth Howell and Karen Shepard in the musical Sound of Music.
 "Marina" w.(Eng) Ray Maxwell m. Rocco Granata
 "The Mating Game" w. Lee Adams m. Charles Strouse. Theme song from the film The Mating Game
 "May You Always" w.m. Larry Markes & Dick Charles
 "Memphis" w.m. Chuck Berry
 "Milord" w. (Eng) B. G. Lewis (Fr) Joseph Mustacchi m. Marguerite Monnot
 "Morgen" w. (Eng) Noel Sherman (Ger) Peter Mosser m. Peter Mosser
 "Mr. Blue" w.m. Dewayne Blackwell
 "My Favorite Things" w. Oscar Hammerstein II m. Richard Rodgers. Introduced by Patricia Neway and Mary Martin in the musical Sound of Music. Performed in the film version by Julie Andrews.
 "My Heart Is an Open Book" w. Hal David m. Lee Pockriss
 "My Wish Came True" w.m. Ivory Joe Hunter
 "Oh! Carol" w. Howard Greenfield m. Neil Sedaka
 "Only Love Me" w. (Eng) Mann Curtis (Ital) Pinchi m. V. Panzuti
 "Only Sixteen" w.m. Barbara Campbell
 "Personality" w.m. Lloyd Price & Harold Logan
 "Pick Me Up On Your Way Down" w.m. Harlan Howard
 "Pillow Talk" w.m. Buddy Pepper & Inez James. Introduced by Doris Day and Rock Hudson in the film of the same name.
 "La Plume De Ma Tante" w.m. Al Hoffman & Dick Manning
 "Poison Ivy" w.m. Jerry Leiber & Mike Stoller
 "Promise Me A Rose" w.m. Bob Merrill, introduced by Eileen Herlie in the musical Take Me Along
 "Put Your Head on My Shoulder" w.m. Paul Anka
 "Quiet Village" m. Les Baxter
 "Running Bear" w.m. J. P. Richardson
 "The Same Old Me" F. Owen
 "Sea Of Love" w.m. George Khoury & Phil Baptiste
 "See You in September" w. Sid Wayne m. Sherman Edwards
 "Seven Little Girls Sitting in the Backseat" w. Bob Hilliard m. Lee Pockriss
 "Shout" O'Kelly Isley, Ronald Isley, Rudolph Isley
 "Side Saddle" m. Trevor H. Stanford
 "Sleep Walk" m. Ann Farina, Johnny Farina & Santo Farina
 "Small World" w. Stephen Sondheim m. Jule Styne. Introduced by Ethel Merman and Jack Klugman in the musical Gypsy
 "Sorry (I Ran All the Way Home)" w.m. Harry Giosasi & Artie Zwirn
 "The Sound Of Music" w. Oscar Hammerstein II m. Richard Rodgers. Introduced by Mary Martin in the musical Sound of Music.
 "Strange Are The Ways Of Love" w. Ned Washington m. Dimitri Tiomkin, from the film western The Young Land
 "Summertime Love" w.m. Frank Loesser
 "Sweet Nothin's" Ronnie Self
 "Take Me Along" w.m. Bob Merrill. Introduced by Jackie Gleason and Walter Pidgeon in the musical Take Me Along.
 "Tall Paul" w.m. Bob Roberts, Bob Sherman & Dick Sherman
 "Tallahassee Lassie" w.m. Frank C. Slay Jr, Bob Crewe & Frederick A. Picariello
 "Teen Angel" w.m. Jean Surrey & Red Surrey
 "A Teenager in Love" w.m. Jerome "Doc" Pomus & Mort Shuman
 "There Goes My Baby" w.m. Benjamin Nelson, Lover Patterson, George Treadwell
 "This Magic Moment" w.m. Doc Pomus & Mort Shuman
 "Three Steps to Heaven" Eddie Cochran
 "The Tijuana Jail" w.m. Denny Thompson
 " ('Til) I Kissed You" w.m. Don Everly
 "Time And The River" w.m. Aaron Schroeder & Wally Gold
 "Too Long At The Fair" w.m. Billy Barnes
 "The Untouchables" m. Nelson Riddle.
 "Venus" w.m. Ed Marshall
 "The Village of St. Bernadette" w.m. Eula Parker
 "Waterloo" w.m. John D. Loudermilk & Marijohn Wilkin
 "We Got Love" w. Kal Mann m. Bernie Lowe
 "What Do You Want?" Les Vandyke
 "What'd I Say" w.m. Ray Charles
 "Why" w. Bob Marcucci m. Peter De Angelis
 "The Wonder of You" w.m. Baker Knight
 "A Worried Man" w.m. Dave Guard & Tom Glazer
 "You're Starting To Get To Me" Sammy Cahn, Jimmy Van Heusen, from the film Say One for Me

Other notable songs
 "Chiclete com banana" w.m. Gordurinha and Almira Castilho
 "Jin-go-lo-ba" w.m. Babatunde Olatunji
 "Ne me quitte pas" w. m. Jacques Brel
 "Piove (Ciao, ciao bambina)" w. Dino Verde m. Domenico Modugno
 "Satchan" w. Hiroo Sakata m. Megumi Ōnaka

Classical music

Premieres

Compositions
 Juhan Aavik – Requiem
 Jean Absil –
 Danses bulgares, op. 103, for piano
 Passacaglia in memoriam Alban Berg, op. 101, for piano
 Rhapsody No. 5, op. 102, for 2 pianos
 Murray Adaskin – Saskatchewan Legend, for orchestra
 Samuel Adler – Toccata, Recitation, and Postlude, for organ
 Stephen Albert – Toccatas (2), for piano
 William Alwyn –
 Symphony No. 4
 Trio for strings
 Hendrik Andriessen –
 Missa populi, for solo voice, congregation, and organ
 Signum Magnum, for soprano, choir, and organ
 Suite, for flute or recorder and piano
 Tota pulchra, anima mea, for 2 voices and organ
 Jurriaan Andriessen – Sonata da camera, for flute, viola, and guitar
 Louis Andriessen –
 Nocturnen, for soprano and chamber orchestra
 Percosse, for flute, trumpet, bassoon, and percussion
 István Anhalt –
 Electronic Composition No. 1 "Sine nomine I"
 Electronic Composition No. 2 "Sine nomine II"
 Hans Erich Apostel –
 Fantasie, op. 31b, for piano
 Österreichische Miniaturen (5), for orchestra
 Vier kleine Klavierstücke, op. 31a, for piano
 Malcolm Arnold –
 Concerto, for guitar and chamber orchestra, op. 67
 Song of Simeon, op. 69 (nativity masque), for mimes, solo voices, and chamber orchestra
 Sweeney Todd, op. 68 (ballet)
 William Blake Songs, op. 66, for alto and strings
 Claude Arrieu –
 Fantaisie lyrique, for ondes martenot and piano
 Suite, for string orchestra
 Robert Ashley – Piano Sonata ("Christopher Columbus crosses to the New World in the Niña, the Pinta and the Santa Maria using only dead reckoning and a crude astrolabe")
 Larry Austin – Homecoming, cantata for soprano and jazz quintet
 Jan Bach – Toccata, for orchestra
 Sven-Erik Bäck – A Game around a Game, for orchestra
 Henk Badings –
 Capriccio, for violin, 2 tapes, and "elektromagnetische Klangfiguren"
 Die Frau von Andros, ballet, electronic music
 Jungle, ballet, electronic music
 Languentibus in purgatorio, for mixed choir
 Psalm 147, for children's chorus, chamber chorus, chorus, and orchestra
 Claude Baillif – Mouvements pour deux, op. 27, for flute and piano
 Tadeusz Baird – Espressioni varianti, for violin and orchestra
 Leonardo Balada – Musica en cuatro tiempos, for piano
 Samuel Barber – Nocturne (Homage to John Field), op. 33, for piano
 Jean Barraqué – ... Au delà du hasard, for SSA soloists, 20 instruments in 4 groups including piano and clarinet soloists
 Leslie Bassett –
 Duets, for 2 cellos
 For City, Nation, World. cantata, for tenor, SATB choir, children's choir ad lib, congregation, 4 trombones, and organ
 Sonata, for violin and piano
 Jürg Baur –
 Chorale Preludes (4), for organ
 Concertino, for flute, oboe, clarinet, string orchestra, and timpani
 Metamorphosen, for piano, violin, and cello
 Gustavo Becerra-Schmidt – String Quartet No. 5
 John J. Becker –
 At Dieppe, for voice and piano
 String Quartet no. 3 (unfinished)
 John Beckwith – Music for Dancing, for orchestra (second orchestration)
 Jack Beeson –
 Against Idleness and Mischief and in Praise of Labor, for high voice and piano
 "Fire, Fire, Quench Desire", for high voice and piano
 Lullaby, for alto and piano (revised version)
 Round and Round, for piano, four-hands
 Symphony No. 1, in A major
 Three Love Songs, for alto and piano (revised version)
 Transformations, for large orchestra
 Paul Ben-Haim –
 Hazono shel navi [The Vision of a Prophet], for tenor, SATB choir, and orchestra
 Poème, for harp
 Arthur Benjamin – String Quartet No. 2
 Richard Rodney Bennett – Music for an Occasion, for orchestra
 Niels Viggo Bentzon – Piano Sonata No. 7, op. 121
 Gunnar Berg –
 Gaffkys I–X, for piano
 Pour clarinette et violon, for clarinet and violin
 Pour piano et orchestre, for piano and orchestra
 37 Aspects (Spoon River) , for ensemble
 Arthur Berger – Chamber Concerto, for small orchestra
 Luciano Berio –
 Allez Hop!, "racconto mimico"
 Différences (1958–59), for ensemble and tape
 Quaderni I, for orchestra
 Thema (Omaggio a Joyce) (1958–59) for voice and tape
 Lennox Berkeley –
 Overture, for light orchestra
 "So sweet love seemed", for mezzo-sopran or baritone and piano
 Sonatina, op. 52, no. 2, for 2 pianos
 Boris Blacher – Musica giocosa, op. 59, for orchestra
 Easley Blackwood, Jr. –
 Concertino, op. 5, for 5 instruments
 String Quartet No. 2, op. 6
 Arthur Bliss – Birthday Song for a Royal Child, SATB choir
 Augustyn Bloch –
 Espressioni, for soprano and orchestra
 Impressioni poetiche, for male choir and orchestra
 Konrad Boehmer – Variation, for orchestra
 William Bolcom – Romantic Pieces, for piano
 Margaret Bonds –
 Dream Portraits (3), for voice and piano
 "Ezekiel saw the wheel", for voice and piano
 "I Got a Home in That Rock", for voice and orchestra or piano
 Mass in D Minor, for choir and organ
 Narcís Bonet – Choral, for organ
 Pierre Boulez –
 Improvisation sur Mallarmé III: A la nue accablante tu, for soprano and orchestra
 Tombeau, for soprano and orchestra
 Paul Bowles – Sweet Bird of Youth, incidental music for the play by Tennessee Williams
 Henry Brant – The Crossing, for tenor, oboe or soprano saxophone, glockenspiel, violin, and cello
 Havergal Brian – Symphony No. 13 in C major
 Benjamin Britten –
 Cantata academica, carmen basiliense, op. 62, for SATB chorus and orchestra
 Fanfare for St Edmundsbury, for 3 trumpets
 Missa brevis in D, op. 63, for boys’ voices and organ
 Oliver Cromwell, for unison voices and piano
 Earle Brown – Hodograph I, for flute, piano + celesta, and percussion
 Alan Bush – Dorian Passacaglia and Fugue, op. 52, for orchestra
 Geoffrey Bush – Songs of Wonder, for soprano or tenor and string orchestra or piano
 Sylvano Bussotti – Piano Pieces for David Tudor
 Nigel Butterley – Joseph and Mary, for soprano and flute
 Cornelius Cardew – Piano Piece 1959
 Elliott Carter – String Quartet No. 2
 Niccolo Castiglioni – Cangiati, for piano
 Chen Gang & He Zhanhao – Butterfly Lovers' Violin Concerto
 Aldo Clementi –
 Ideogrammi No. 1, for 16 instruments
 Ideogrammi No. 2, for flute and 17 instruments
 Aaron Copland –
 Dance Panels, for orchestra
 Paisaje mexicana and Danza de Jalisco, as Two Mexican Pieces, for orchestra; later became part of Three Latin American Sketches (1971)
 John Corigliano –
 Kaleidoscope, for 2 pianos
 Petits Fours, for violin and piano
 Paul Creston –
 Janus, op. 77, for orchestra
 Prelude and Dance, op. 76, for band
 George Crumb – Variazioni for large orchestra
 Halim El-Dabh –
 Elements, Beings and Primevals, for tape
 Juxtaposition No. 1, for percussion ensemble
 Juxtaposition No. 2, for percussion and harp
 Juxtaposition No. 3, for mezzo-soprano, 2 harps, and percussion
 Leiyla and the Poet, for tape
 Meditation on White Noise, for tape
 The Word, for tape,
 Mario Davidovsky – Serie sinfonica 1959 for orchestra
 Peter Maxwell Davies –
Ricercar and Doubles (on "To Many a Well"), for ensemble, Op. 10
Richard II, incidental music to Shakespeare's play, WoO 51
 Paul Dessau –
 Flug zur Sonne, dance scenes
 Hymne auf den Beginn einer neuen Geschichte der Menschheit, for speaker, soprano, chorus, 3 pianos, 2 harps, double bass, timpani, and percussion
 David Diamond –
 A Private World, for piano
 Sonata, for solo cello
 Sonata, for solo violin
 Symphony No. 7
John Downey – Eastlake Terrace, for piano
 Henri Dutilleux – Symphony No. 2 (Le Double)
 Werner Egk –
 Furchtlosigkeit und Wohlwollen, oratorio for tenor, mixed chorus, and orchestra (revised version)
 Variationen über ein karibisches Thema, for orchestra
 Gottfried von Einem – Tanz-Rondo, op. 27, for orchestra
 Hanns Eisler –
 Brandverse, for voice and piano
 Motto (Auf einer chinesischen Theewurzellöwen), for voice and piano
 Musik zu ‘Schweyk im zweiten Weltkrieg’, for voice and small orchestra
 Trommellied, for voice and piano
 Rezitativ und Fuge auf 60. Geburtstag von J. R. Becher, for voice and piano
 Um meine Weisheit unbekümmert, for voice and piano
 Nicolas Flagello –
Concerto for strings, Op. 27
Tristis est anima mea, for SATB choir and orchestra, Op. 29
 Kenneth Gaburo – Stray Birds, for soprano and piano
 Roberto Gerhard –
 Asylum Diary, incidental music for the play by Lavant
 Chaconne, for solo violin
 Coriolanus, incidental music for the play by Shakespeare
 Don Carlos, incidental music for the play by Schiller
 Lament on the Death of a Bullfighter, for speaker and tape
 Ottmar Gerster –
 Concerto, for horn and orchestra
 Vorwärts!, for baritone, speaker, SATB choir, and chamber orchestra
 Peggy Glanville-Hicks –
 Drama for Orchestra, for clarinet, trumpet, piano, 3 percussionists, strings
 Saul and the Witch of Endor, ballet for television
 Roger Goeb –
 Concertino no. 2, for orchestra
 Iowa Concerto, for chamber orchestra
 Alexander Goehr –
 Fantasia, op. 4 (revised version), for orchestra
 Songs from the Japanese, op. 9, for mezzo-soprano and piano or orchestra
 Variations, op. 8, for flute and piano
 Henryk Górecki – Symphony No. 1 1959
 Fernando Lopes Graça –
 Canções populares portuguesas (24), book 4, for voice and piano
 História trágico-marítima, second version, for baritone, alto chorus, and orchestra
 A menina do mar, for chamber orchestra
 Nocturnos (5), for piano
 As predicações de Adamastor contra os portugueses, for voice and piano
 Prelúdio e dança burlesca, for 2 pianos
 Rondes et complaintes des provinces de France, for choir
 Tres peças, for violin and piano
 Tres velhos fandangos portugueses, version for piano
 Camargo Guarnieri –
 "O amor de agora", for voice and piano
 "Onde andará", for voice and piano
 Ponteios, volume 5, for piano
 Sonata No. 5, for violin and piano
 Valsa No. 10, for piano
 Cristóbal Halffter –
 Sonata, for violin solo
 Three Pieces, for flute solo
 Rodolfo Halffter – Tripartita, op. 25, for orchestra
 Iain Hamilton –
 Sinfonia, for two orchestras
 Sonata for cello and piano
 Karl Amadeus Hartmann – Concerto funebre for violin and strings (1939, revised 1959)
 Roman Haubenstock-Ramati – Interpolation: Mobile pour flûte
 Bernhard Heiden – Viola Sonata
 Hans Werner Henze –
 Sonata for piano
 L’usignolo dell’imperatore, balletto-pantomima, after Hans Christian Andersen
 Paul Hindemith –
 Festmarsch, for 3 male voices and tuba
 Joseph, lieber Joseph mein, canon for 4 voices
 Six songs from Das Marienleben, op. 27, arranged for soprano and orchestra
 Alan Hovhaness –
 Bardo Sonata, op. 192, for piano
 Concerto for Accordion and Orchestra, op. 174
 Lake of Van Sonata, op. 175, for piano (revised version)
 , op. 173, for chamber orchestra
 , op. 175, for wind ensemble
 Andrew Imbrie – Legend, for orchestra
 Maki Ishii – Prelude and Variations, for flute, clarinet, bassoon, horn, violin, viola, cello, piano, and percussion
 Jānis Ivanovs – Piano Concerto in G minor
 Francis Jackson – Diversion for Mixtures
 Miloslav Kabeláč –
 Cizokrajné motivy [Motifs from Foreign Countries], op. 38, for piano
 Suite from Master of Nine Songs’, op. 34a, for baritone and orchestra
 Suite, op. 39, for saxophone and piano
Dmitri Kabalevsky –
 Preludes and Fugues, op. 61
 The Leninists, cantata after Y. Dolmatovski for three choruses and large symphony orchestra, op. 63
 Mauricio Kagel – Transición II, for piano, percussion, and two tape recorders
 Aram Khachaturian –
 Lermontov: Suite, for orchestra
 Sonatina, for piano
 Tikhon Khrennikov – Violin Concerto No. 1, op. 14
 Gottfried Michael Koenig –
 Quintet for Winds, for flute, oboe, cor anglais, clarinet, and bassoon
 String Quartet 1959
 Ernst Krenek –
 Flötenstück neunphasig, op. 171, for flute and 6 pianos
 Hausmusik, op. 172, for various instruments
 Quaestio temporis, op. 170, for small orchestra
 Six Motets, op. 169, for 4 voices
 György Kurtág –
 String Quartet No. 1, op. 1
 Wind Quintet, op. 2
 John La Montaine – Fragments from the Song of Songs, op. 29, for soprano and orchestra
 Ingvar Lidholm – Mutanza, for orchestra
 György Ligeti – Apparitions, for orchestra (1958–59)
 Otto Luening – Fantasia, for string quartet and orchestra
 Witold Lutosławski –
 Dance Preludes, version for 9 instruments
 Piosenki dziecinne (3), for voice and piano
 Elizabeth Maconchy – A Hymn to God the Father, for tenor and piano
 Bruno Maderna –
 L’altro mondo, ovvero Gli stati e imperi della luna, music for a radio play by A. Brissoni, after Jonathan Swift's Gulliver's Travels
 Piano Concerto
 Donald Martino – Trio, for violin, clarinet, and piano
 Bohuslav Martinů –
 The Burden of Moab, cantata, for male voices and piano
 Impromptus (2), for harpsichord
 Madrigaly, for mixed voices
 Mikeš z hor, chamber cantata, for solo voices, chorus, 2 violins, viola, and piano
 Musique de chambre no. 1, for clarinet, violin, viola, cello, harp, and piano
 Nonet, for flute, oboe, clarinet, bassoon, horn, violin, viola, cello, and double bass
 Pièce, for 2 cellos
 Písničky pro dětský sbor, for children’s choir
 The Prophecy of Isaiah, cantata, for solo voices, male chorus, trumpet, viola, piano, and timpani
 Ptačí hody, for children’s voices and trumpet
 Variations on a Slovak Folksong, for cello and piano
 Vigilie, for organ
 Znělka, for children’s voices
 Yoritsune Matsudaira –
 Danse sacrée et Danse finale, for orchestra
 Katsura, for soprano, flute, guitar, harp, harpsichord, and percussion
 Toshirō Mayuzumi –
 Campanology, electronic music
 Sange, for male choir
 Shukukon-ka [Wedding Song], for chorus and orchestra
 U so ri, oratorio
 Peter Mennin – Sonata concertante, for violin and piano
 Darius Milhaud –
 Burma Road, op. 375, incidental music for television
 Mother Courage, op. 379, incidental music for the play by Bertolt Brecht
 Sonatina, op. 378, for viola and piano
 Symphonie concertante, op. 376, for bassoon, horn, trumpet, double bass, and orchestra
 Symphony No. 9, op. 380
 Federico Mompou – Impressiones intimas, for piano (revised version)
 Makoto Moroi –
 Chamber Cantata No. 2
 Pitagoras no hoshi [Stars of Pythagoras], music drama, for solo voice, instruments, and tape
 Thea Musgrave –
 Scottish Dance Suite, for orchestra
 Triptych, for tenor and orchestra
 Bo Nilsson –
 Ett blocks timme, cantata for soprano and chamber orchestra
 Stenogram, for organ
 Brief an Gösta Oswald, cantata trilogy
 Ein irrender Sohn, for alto, alto flute, and chamber ensemble
 Mädchentotenlieder, for soprano, alto flute, and chamber ensemble
 Und die Zeiger seiner Augen wurden langsam zurückgedreht, for alto or soprano and orchestra
 Luigi Nono – Composizione no. 2 (Diario polacco ‘58), for orchestra
 Andrzej Panufnik –
 Pieśni ludowych (5) unison choir, 2 flutes, 2 clarinets, and bass clarinet (revised version)
 Polonia, suite for orchestra
 Arvo Pärt –
 Meie aed, op. 3, for children’s chorus and orchestra
 Sonatine, op. 1, no. 2, for piano
 Oedoen Partos
Improvisation and Niggun for harp
Maqamat, for flute and strings
 Vincent Persichetti –
 Song of Peace, op. 82, for TTBB/SATB choir and piano
 String Quartet No. 3, op. 81
 Michel Philippot – Composition No. 1, for string orchestra
 Walter Piston –
 Concerto, for 2 pianos and orchestra
 Three New England Sketches, for orchestra
 Quincy Porter –
 Concerto for harpsichord and orchestra
 Concerto (Concertino), for wind orchestra
 Francis Poulenc -
 Gloria
 Henri Pousseur –
 Préhistoire du cinéma, 1–track tape
 Rimes pour différentes sources sonores, for 3 orchestral groups and 2-track tape
 Juan Orrego-Salas –
 Alabanzas a la Virgen, op. 49, for soprano or tenor and piano
 Garden Songs, op. 47, for soprano, flute, viola, and harp
 George Perle – Wind Quintet No. 1
 Allan Pettersson – Symphony No. 4 (1958–59)
 H. Owen Reed –
 Che-Ba-Kun-Ah (Road of Souls), for band, or for winds and string quartet
 Renascence, for band
 George Rochberg – Bartókiana, for piano
 Ned Rorem –
 "Memory", for voice and piano
 Miracles of Christmas, for SATB choir and organ
 "My Papa's Waltz", for voice and piano
 "Night Crow", for voice and piano
 "Root Cellar", for voice and piano
 Two Poems of Theodore Roethke, for voice and piano
 "The Waking", for voice and piano
 Hilding Rosenberg –
 Glaukes sånger (revised version), for voice and piano
 Quintet for winds
 Riflessioni No. 1, for string orchestra
 Sonata, for solo flute
 Songs (4), for voice and piano
 Frederic Rzewski – Poem, for piano
 Vadim Salmanov – Symphony No. 2 in G
 Domingo Santa Cruz – String Quartet No. 3, op. 31
 Giacinto Scelsi – Quattro pezzi su una nota sola ["Four pieces each on a single note"]
 Bogusław Schaeffer – Concerto breve for cello
 Pierre Schaeffer – Etudes aux objets
 R. Murray Schafer – In memoriam: Alberto Guerrero, for string orchestra
 Hermann Schroeder –
 Missa figuralis, for choir, instruments, and organ
 Partita Veni Creator Spiritus, for organ
 Quartet No. 3, for oboe, violin, viola, and cello
 Gunther Schuller –
 Abstraction, for nine instruments
 Concertino, for jazz quartet and orchestra
 Conversations, for jazz quartet and string quartet
 William Schuman – Violin Concerto (revised version)
 Makoto Shinohara –
 Kassouga, for flute and piano
 Pièces concertantes (3), for trumpet and piano
 Dmitri Shostakovich – Cello Concerto No. 1
 Karlheinz Stockhausen –
 Refrain, for three players
 Zyklus, for a percussionist
 Igor Stravinsky –
 Double Canon: Raoul Dufy in memoriam, for four instruments
 Epitaphium, "Für das Grabmal des Prinzen Max Egon zu Fürstenberg", for flute, clarinet, and harp
 Carlos Surinach – Concerto for Orchestra
 Tōru Takemitsu –
 Ikari wo komete furikaereba [Looking Back with Rage], incidental music
 Kaizoku [A Pirate], incidental music
 Saegirarenai kyūsoku [Uninterrupted Rest] I–III, for piano
 Scene, for cello and string orchestra
 Shiseru ōjo [A Dead Princess], incidental music
 Randall Thompson –
 Frostiana, for 3–7 voices and piano or orchestra
 The Gate of Heaven, 4-part choir
 Virgil Thomson –
 Bertha (incidental music for the play by K. Koch)
 Collected Poems (K. Koch), for soprano, baritone, and orchestra
 Fugues and Cantilenas for orchestra
 Lamentations, for accordion
 Mostly about Love (Four Songs for Alice Estey), for voice and piano
 Michael Tippett – Lullaby, for 6 solo voices: alto, two sopranos, two tenors, and bass
 Erich Urbanner – Concertino, for flute and orchestra
 Vladimir Ussachevsky –
 The Boy Who Saw Through, film score
 Studies in Sound, Plus, for tape
 David Van Vactor – Symphony No. 3
 Heitor Villa-Lobos –
 Concerto Grosso, for wind quartet and wind ensemble
 Suite No. 1, for chamber orchestra
 Suite No. 2, for chamber orchestra
 William Walton –
 Anon in Love, 6 songs for tenor and guitar or orchestra
 March: A History of the English-speaking Peoples, incidental music for ABC TV
 A Queen’s Fanfare, for brass
 Egon Wellesz –
 Lieder aus Wien, op. 82, for voice and piano
 Quintet, op.81 for clarinet and string quartet
 Rhapsodie, op. 87, for viola
 Healey Willan –
 Passacaglia and Fugue no. 2 in E minor, op. 178, for organ
 Poem for Strings, op. 82, version for string orchestra
 Grace Williams – All Seasons Shall Be Sweet
 Charles Wuorinen –
 Musica duarum partium ecclesiastica, for brass quintet, timpani, piano, and organ
 Symphony No. 3
 Trio concertante, for oboe, violin, and piano
 La Monte Young –
 Sarabande, for any instruments
 Studies I, II, and III, for piano
 Vision, for piano, 2 brass, recorder, 4 bassoons, violin, viola, cello, and double bass
 Jōji Yuasa – Projection Topologic, for piano
 Iannis Xenakis –
 Analogique B, for 2-track tape
 Duel for Two Small Orchestras
 Syrmos, for 12 violins, 3 cellos, and 3 double basses
 Çesk Zadeja – Atdheu im, cantata for tenor and mixed chorus

Opera
 Samuel Adler – The Outcast of Poker Flat
 Jurriaan Andriessen – Kalchas
 Claude Arrieu – La cabine téléphonique (March 15, 1959, RTF)
 Henk Badings – Salto mortale (TV chamber opera), Nederlandse Televisie Sichting, June 19, 1959
 Samuel Barber – A Hand of Bridge
 Grażyna Bacewicz – Przygoda króla Artura
 Karl-Birger Blomdahl – Aniara
 Carlos Chávez – Love Propitiated October 28, 1959, Mexico City (revised version of Panfilo e Lauretta)
 Paul Dessau – Puntila
 Ferenc Farkas – Paradies der Schwiegersöhne
 Nicolas Flagello – The Judgment of St Francis, Op. 28 (composed; staged 1966, New York)
 Lukas Foss – Introductions and Goodbyes (a nine-minute opera, libretto by Gian Carlo Menotti)
 Peggy Glanville-Hicks – The Glittering Gate (New York, May 15, 1959)
 Jakov Gotovac – Stanac
 Alan Hovhaness – Blue Flame, op. 172
 Sven-Eric Johanson – Kunskapens vin
 Elizabeth Maconchy – The Sofa
 Carl Orff –  (Stuttgart, December 11, 1959)
 Francis Poulenc – La voix humaine

Jazz

Musical theater
 Aladdin (Cole Porter) London production opened at the Coliseum on December 17.
 Destry Rides Again Broadway production opened at the Imperial Theatre on April 23 and ran for 472 performances
 Fings Ain't Wot They Used T'Be (Lionel Bart) Stratford production opened at the Theatre Royal on April 17 and ran for 63 performances
 Fiorello! Broadway production opened at the Broadhurst Theatre on November 23 and ran for 795 performances
 Gypsy (Jule Styne and Stephen Sondheim) Broadway production opened at The Broadway Theatre on May 21 and ran for 702 performances
 Juno (Marc Blitzstein) Broadway production opened at the Winter Garden Theatre, New York, March 9, 1959, and ran for 16 performances
 Little Mary Sunshine Off-Broadway production opened at the Orpheum Theatre on November 18 and ran for 1143 performances.
 Lock Up Your Daughters (Lionel Bart) London production opened at the Mermaid Theatre on May 28 and ran for 328 performances
 The Love Doctor London production opened at the Piccadilly Theatre on October 12 and ran for only 16 performances.
 On the Town Broadway revival opened at the Carnegie Hall Playhouse on January 15 and ran for 70 performances
 Once Upon a Mattress Broadway production opened at the St. James Theatre and ran for 244 performances
 Redhead Broadway production opened at the 46th Street Theatre on February 5 and ran for 405 performances
 The Sound of Music (Richard Rodgers and Oscar Hammerstein II) Broadway production opened at the Lunt-Fontanne Theatre on November 16 and ran for 1443 performances.
 Take Me Along Broadway production opened at the Shubert Theatre on October 22 and ran for 448 performances

Musical films
 Expresso Bongo British film starring Laurence Harvey
 Char Dil Char Rahen, music by Anil Biswas, starring Raj Kapoor and Shammi Kapoor
 Dil Deke Dekho, music by Usha Khanna, starring Asha Parekh
 The Five Pennies starring Danny Kaye
 Go, Johnny, Go starring Jimmy Clanton and Sandy Stewart, and featuring Chuck Berry, Jackie Wilson, Ritchie Valens, The Cadillacs, Jo-Ann Campbell, The Flamingos and Eddie Cochran.
 Li'l Abner featuring most of the cast of the original Broadway production
 The Lady is a Square starring Anna Neagle, Frankie Vaughan, Janette Scott, Anthony Newley and Wilfrid Hyde-White
 Porgy And Bess, based on 1935 folk opera, directed by Otto Preminger, starring Sidney Poitier (singing voice dubbed by Robert McFerrin), Dorothy Dandridge (singing voice dubbed by Adele Addison) and Sammy Davis, Jr.
 Say One for Me starring Bing Crosby and Debbie Reynolds
 Tommy the Toreador starring Tommy Steele
 Sleeping Beauty from Walt Disney Pictures (animated)

Births
January 2 – Cristina, no-wave singer (d. 2020)
January 3 – Curt Bisquera, drummer
January 4 – Vanity, Canadian-American singer-songwriter, dancer and actress (d. 2016)
January 6 – Kathy Sledge, vocalist (Sister Sledge)
January 7 – Kathy Valentine new wave musician (The Go-Go's)
January 8 – Paul Hester, drummer (Crowded House) (d. 2005)
January 10 – Curt Kirkwood, alternative rock singer-songwriter (Meat Puppets)
January 12
 Blixa Bargeld (Einstürzende Neubauten)
 Per Gessle (Roxette)
January 14
 Chas Smash (Madness)
 Geoff Tate (Queensrÿche)
January 16 – Sade, singer
January 17
 Susanna Hoffs, singer (The Bangles)
 Fabio Luisi, conductor
 Momoe Yamaguchi, singer and actress
January 21 – Duane Denison, guitarist (The Jesus Lizard and Tomahawk)
January 28
Dave Sharp, English guitarist (The Alarm and The Hard Travelers)
Bill Ware, American vibraphone player Dave Sharp (The Alarm)
January 30 – Jody Watley, singer
February 3 – Lol Tolhurst, The Cure
February 14 – Renée Fleming, operatic soprano
February 15 – Ali Campbell, ska musician (UB40)
February 25 – Mike Peters, singer-songwriter (The Alarm)
March 7 – Andy Diagram, trumpet player
March 16 – Flavor Flav, rapper (Public Enemy)
March 17 – Mike Lindup, keyboard player and vocalist (Level 42)
March 18 – Irene Cara, singer-songwriter and film actress (d. 2022)
March 19 – Terry Hall, ska singer (The Specials) (d. 2022)
March 21 – Nobuo Uematsu, video game composer
March 27 – Andrew Farriss, rock musician (INXS)
March 29 – Perry Farrell, alternative rock singer (Jane's Addiction)
April 1 – Margita "Magi" Stefanović, Serbian keyboardist (d. 2002)
April 10
 Babyface, R&B musician and record producer
 Brian Setzer, guitarist and singer (The Stray Cats)
April 21
 Jerry Only, American singer-songwriter and bass player (The Misfits, Osaka Popstar and Kryst the Conqueror)
 Robert Smith, singer (The Cure)
 Michael Timmins alternative country/folk rock songwriter and guitarist (Cowboy Junkies)
April 27
 Marco Pirroni, guitarist (Adam and the Ants, Siouxsie and the Banshees (founder member), The Models, The Wolfmen)
 Sheena Easton, singer
April 29 – Yasuhiro Kobayashi, Japanese musician, accordionist, composer and arranger
May 3 – David Ball, Soft Cell
May 4 – Randy Travis, country singer
May 5 – Ian McCulloch, singer (Echo & the Bunnymen)
May 20
Susan Cowsill, rock singer-songwriter (The Cowsills, Continental Drifters)
Gregory Gray, singer-songwriter (d. 2019)
May 22 – Morrissey, singer-songwriter (The Smiths, solo)
May 28 – Steve Strange, singer (Visage) (d. 2015)
June 1 – Alan Wilder (Depeche Mode)
June 11 – Kathinka Pasveer, flautist
June 12 – John Linnell (They Might Be Giants)
June 19
Mark DeBarge (DeBarge)
Dennis Fuller, Jamaican born English singer (London Boys) (d. 1996)
June 21
Marcella Detroit, American singer-songwriter and guitarist (Shakespear's Sister)
Kathy Mattea, American singer-songwriter and guitarist
June 22 – Alan Anton (Cowboy Junkies)
June 24 – Andy McCluskey (Orchestral Manoeuvres in the Dark)
June 29 – Buren Fowler, American guitarist (Drivin N Cryin) (d. 2014)
July 1 – Edem Ephraim, English singer (London Boys) (d. 1996)
July 3 – Stephen Pearcy, American heavy metal singer-songwriter (Ratt)
July 5 – Marc Cohn, singer-songwriter
July 9
 Marc Almond, synthpop singer (Soft Cell)
 Jim Kerr, singer (Simple Minds)
July 11
 Richie Sambora (Bon Jovi)
 Suzanne Vega, American singer-songwriter, musician and record producer
July 16 – James MacMillan, composer and conductor
July 18 – Jonathan Dove, English operatic composer
July 20 – Radney Foster, American singer-songwriter, guitarist and producer (Foster & Lloyd)
August 1 – Joe Elliott, English hard rock singer (Def Leppard)
August 6 – Joyce Sims, American R&B singer-songwriter (d. 2022)
August 9 – Kurtis Blow, rapper
August 13 – Martyn Brabbins, English conductor
August 29 – Eddi Reader, Scottish singer
August 30 – Andreas Delfs, German conductor
August 31 – Tony DeFranco, singer (The DeFranco Family)
September 8 – Daler Nazarov, Tajik composer, singer and actor
September 14 – Morten Harket, singer (a-ha)
October 1 – Youssou N'Dour, Senegalese singer
October 4 – Chris Lowe, keyboardist (Pet Shop Boys)
October 10 – Kirsty MacColl, English singer (d. 2000)
October 13 – Marie Osmond, singer
October 16
 Gary Kemp (Spandau Ballet)
 Erkki-Sven Tüür, composer
October 21 – Cleveland Watkiss, jazz vocalist
October 23 – "Weird Al" Yankovic, parodist, musician and singer
October 25 – Christina Amphlett, Australian rock singer
November 1 – Eddie MacDonald (The Alarm)
November 5 – Bryan Adams, singer/guitarist
November 27 – Charlie Burchill (Simple Minds)
November 29 – Steve Hindalong, record producer
December 4 – Bob Griffin (The BoDeans)
December 26 – Chuck Mosley, singer (Faith No More) (d. 2017)
December 30 – Tracey Ullman, comedian and singer
December 31
 Baron Waqa, Nauruan politician and composer
 Paul Westerberg, singer, guitarist and songwriter (The Replacements)

Deaths
January 6 – José Enrique Pedreira, composer, 54
February 3, in a plane crash (see Events)
 Buddy Holly, singer, songwriter and guitarist, 22
 Ritchie Valens, singer, songwriter and guitarist, 17
 The Big Bopper, disc jockey, singer, and songwriter, 28
February 12 – George Antheil, pianist and composer, 58 (heart attack)
February 13 – William Axt, film composer, 70
February 14 – Baby Dodds, jazz musician, 60
February 18 – Erich Zeisl, composer, 53 (heart attack)
February 28 – Maxwell Anderson, lyricist, 70
March 1 – Mack Gordon, songwriter, 54
March 15 – Lester Young, jazz musician, 49 (liver disease and malnutrition)
March 25 – Billy Mayerl, English pianist and composer, 56 (heart attack)
April 20 – Edward Johnson, operatic tenor, 80
April 22 – Claire Delbos, French composer and violinist, 52
May 14 – Sidney Bechet, jazz musician, 62
May 29 – Frank Marshall, pianist and teacher, 75
June 9 – Sonnie Hale, English actor and singer, 57 (myelofibrosis)
July 15 – Ernest Bloch, composer, 78
July 17 – Billie Holiday, jazz and blues singer, 44 (liver and heart disease)
August 7 – Armas Launis, Finnish composer and ethnomusicologist, 75
August 15 – Blind Willie McTell, American blues singer, 61
August 16 – Wanda Landowska, harpsichordist, 80
August 17 – Pedro Humberto Allende, composer and ethnomusicologist, 74
August 28 – Bohuslav Martinů, composer, 68
September 1 – Jack Norworth, singer and songwriter, 80
September 6 – Kay Kendall, musical comedy actress, 33 (leukaemia)
September 8 – Mohammed El-Bakkar, Lebanese tenor, oud player, and conductor, 46 (cerebral hemorrhage)
September 11 – Ann Drummond-Grant, operatic contralto, 54
September 17 – Omer Simeon, jazz musician, 57 (throat cancer)
September 21 – Agnes Nicholls, operatic soprano, 83
September 22
 Josef Matthias Hauer, composer, 76
 Jane Winton, actress, dancer, operatic soprano, writer, and painter, 53
September 25 – Helen Broderick, Broadway star, 68
September 28 – Gerard Hoffnung, artist, comedian, and musician, 34 (cerebral haemorrhage)
October 7 – Mario Lanza, operatic tenor, 38 (pulmonary embolism)
October 28 – Egon Kornauth, Austrian composer and pianist, 68
November 7 – Alberto Guerrero, pianist and composer, 73
November 17 – Heitor Villa-Lobos, composer, 72
November 22 – Sam M. Lewis, lyricist, 74
November 26 – Albert Ketèlbey, composer, conductor and pianist, 84
November 29 – Fritz Brun, Swiss composer and conductor, 81
December 20 – Gilda Gray, dancer, 58 (heart attack)
 date unknown
 Clotilde Arias, songwriter
 Susan Metcalfe Casals, operatic mezzo-soprano

Awards

Eurovision Song Contest
 Eurovision Song Contest 1959

Grammy Awards
 Grammy Awards of 1959

Pulitzer Prize for Music
 John La Montaine – Piano Concerto

References

 
20th century in music
Music by year